Nigel Latta Blows Stuff Up is a New Zealand science television series  that started on 19 April 2015, hosted by Nigel Latta.

Episodes 

Episode 1: Lightning 
23:52 min

Episode 2: Explosions 
23:44 min

Episode 3: Weather 
23:50 min

Episode 4: Collisions 
23:46 min

Episode 5: Fire 
23:24 min

Episode 6: Space 
23:48 min

Episode 7: Sound 
22:23 min

Episode 8: Gravity 
23:45 min

Watch options 

 Curiosity Stream
 Apple TV
 TVNC

References

2015 New Zealand television series debuts
Science education television series
New Zealand documentary television series
Television shows funded by NZ on Air
TVNZ 1 original programming